The 1973 Leicester City Council election took place on 7 June 1973 to elect members of Leicester City Council in England. This was on the same day as other local elections.

This was the inaugural election of Leicester City Council.

Summary

|}

References

Uttlesford
Uttlesford District Council elections
1970s in Essex